The shashka (– long-knife) or shasqua,  is a kind of sabre; a single-edged, single-handed, and guardless backsword. In appearance, the shashka is midway between a typically curved sabre and a straight sword. It has a slightly curved blade, and can be effective for both cutting and thrusting.

History

The shashka originated among the mountain tribes of the Caucasus. The earliest depictions of this sword date to the late 17th century, though most extant shashkas have hilts dating to the 19th century. The earliest datable example is from 1713. Later, most of the Russian and Ukrainian Cossacks adopted the weapon. Two styles of shashka exist: the Caucasian/Circassian shashka and the Cossack shashka. In 1834 the Russian government produced the first military-issue shashka pattern.

The blades of non-regulation shashkas were of diverse origins; some were locally made in the Caucasus, others in Russia, some were manufactured in Germany, mostly in Solingen, and displayed imitations of the 'running wolf' mark of Passau. 

The typically Circassian (Adyghe) form of sabre was longer than the Cossack type; in fact, the Russian word shashka originally came from the Adyghe word –  (Sashko) – meaning "long knife". It gradually replaced the sabre in all cavalry units except hussars during the 19th century. 

Russian troops, having encountered it during their conquest of the Caucasus (1817–1864), preferred it to their issued sabres. 

At this time, there were three types of non-regulation shashka:

 The Caucasus type, where the handle almost sits inside the scabbard. This type was used by Kuban Cossacks and tribes from the Caucasus. The only problem with this type of shashka was that in the rain, water could go down into the scabbard. This type of shashka was very light (300–400 grams), very flexible and strong. The best and most famous shashkas of these types were Gurda, Volchek (running wolf symbol on the blade).
 The Don Cossack shashka, which has a straighter blade.
 The Terek Cossack shashka; the hilt, like the Don Cossack shashka, does not go inside the scabbard. It is very light and strong. 

The first officially regulated Russian military shashka was the 1834 pattern, also called the "Nizhegorodka". This was followed by the 1838 pattern shashka. In 1881, two patterns were introduced: a 'Cossack' pattern, which was typical in not having a guard, and a 'dragoon' pattern, which was much more like a standard sabre in having a brass knuckle-bow, and was derived from the 1841 dragoon sabre. The blades of the two types were, however, essentially identical.

The Cossack hosts (not full-time regiments) used non-regulation shashkas until 1904, when they received their own regulation pattern.

The Soviet government introduced the 1927 pattern, which was very similar to the 1881 Cossack pattern; production of this pattern continued until 1946. The last pattern shashkas to be introduced were the 1940 patterns for "line commanding personnel" and generals—both had knuckle-bows.

Construction

The shashka was a relatively short sabre, typically being  in total length. It had a slightly curved, fullered, blade with a single edge; the back of the blade was often sharpened for the 3rd of the blade nearest the tip (a false edge). The hilt had no guard (except for Russian Dragoon 'shashka' patterns, which had a brass knuckle-bow and quillon, and a conventional sabre pommel). The pommel was hook-shaped and divided into two 'ears'. This is a feature found in many weapons of the Western Asian highlands, from the Turkish yataghan to the Afghan pesh-kabz. The sword was worn in a scabbard suspended with the edge uppermost. The Caucasian form of the shashka had a scabbard which enclosed most of the hilt, with little more than the hooked pommel protruding.

Plainer, non-regulation shashkas often had hilts of horn, more highly decorated examples had hilts sheathed in niello-inlaid silver, with scabbard mounts to match. Russian military shashkas were much plainer, with hilts typically consisting of a brass ferrule, ribbed wooden grip and brass pommel. Unlike traditional non-regulation shashkas, the pommel of pattern shashkas was pierced to receive a sword-knot. The pommel was decorated with an imperial insignia; following the 1917 revolution, this was often ground off. Shashkas manufactured under the Soviet regime (Pattern 1927) had Communist symbols in place of the imperial ones. Later trooper models often had modified brass scabbard furniture to hold a bayonet for the Mosin–Nagant carbine. Officer's models, though of similar construction, did not have an attached bayonet, and were much more heavily decorated. In Tsarist times officers had considerable freedom in the decoration of their shaskas and some had non-regulation blades.

The 1834 pattern shashka was a popular weapon, when it was replaced by the 1881 pattern, several regiments complained so vociferously that their 1834s were returned to them.

The 1838 Pattern - typical statistics for a pattern sword:

Total length: 1030 mm

Blade length: 875 mm

Blade width: 36 mm

Blade curvature: 62/375 mm

Point of balance: 170-180 mm

Weight: 1067 g

Use
There is little or no surviving contemporary written information on how the people of the Caucasus used the shashka. However, surviving Russian military manuals indicate that, despite the lack of protection for the hand, the military shashka was used in much the same manner as a Western European sabre, with very similar cuts, thrusts, guards and parries. In particular, Russian soldiers were not taught to cut in one movement from unsheathing, whatever Caucasus traditions suggest.

See also
 Parikaoba/Farikaoba (:ru:Парикаоба) – traditional Caucasian fencing with shashka and buckler

References

Cited works 
 Kirill A. Rivkin (no date). "Scaling universality and quantitative analysis of historical edged weapons based on allometric equation", Seagate Technology.
 Leonid Tarassuk and Claude Blair (1982). The Complete Encyclopedia of Arms & Weapons. Simon and Schuster.
 Ruslan Urazbakhtin (2018). "Shashka in Late XIX–XX C: Outline of Russian Combat Techniques", Acta Periodica Duellatorum (vol. 6, issue 2), Matyas Miskolczi (ed.) . .

External links 
 
 Steel of Sakartvelo (documentary about traditional Caucasus fencing)

Military organization of Cossacks
Sabres
Single-edged swords
Weapons of Russia
European swords
Russo-Japanese war weapons of Russia
Weapons of the Russian Empire

kk:Қылыш